Nanaimo—Ladysmith is a federal electoral district in British Columbia.

Nanaimo—Ladysmith was created by the 2012 federal electoral boundaries redistribution and was legally defined in the 2013 representation order. It has come into effect with the call of the 42nd Canadian federal election, on August 2, 2015. 55% of the riding came from the previous riding of Nanaimo—Cowichan and 44% from Nanaimo—Alberni.

Demographics

According to the Canada 2021 Census
Languages: 87.4% English, 1.2% French, 1.2% Mandarin
Religions: 62.9% No religion, 31.7% Christian (9.2% Catholic, 4% United Church, 3.9% Anglican, 1.2% Baptist, 1.2% Lutheran), 1.1% Sikh
Median income (2020): $39,600 
Average income (2020): $49,080

Members of Parliament

This riding has elected the following members of the House of Commons of Canada:

Election results

Notes

References

British Columbia federal electoral districts
British Columbia federal electoral districts on Vancouver Island
Politics of Nanaimo